Walter Roe Mansfield (July 1, 1911 – January 8, 1987) was a United States circuit judge of the United States Court of Appeals for the Second Circuit and previously was a United States District Judge of the United States District Court for the Southern District of New York.

Education and career

Mansfield was born on July 1, 1911, in Boston, Massachusetts, the son of Boston Mayor Frederick W. Mansfield and Helen Elizabeth (Roe) Mansfield. He received an Artium Baccalaureus degree from Harvard University in 1932. He received a Bachelor of Laws from Harvard Law School in 1935. He was in private practice of law in New York City, New York from 1935 to 1939, from 1941 to 1942, and from 1946 to 1966. Mansfield was the first American officer who was in headquarter of Chetnik leader Draža Mihailović.

He was an Assistant United States Attorney of the Southern District of New York from 1939 to 1941. He was in the United States Marine Corps from 1942 to 1946.

Federal judicial service

Mansfield was nominated by President Lyndon B. Johnson on June 13, 1966, to a seat on the United States District Court for the Southern District of New York vacated by Judge John M. Cashin. He was confirmed by the United States Senate on June 29, 1966, and received his commission the same day. His service was terminated on June 8, 1971, due to his elevation to the Second Circuit.

Mansfield was nominated by President Richard Nixon on April 26, 1971, to a seat on the United States Court of Appeals for the Second Circuit vacated by Judge Leonard P. Moore. He was confirmed by the Senate on May 20, 1971, and received his commission the same day. He assumed senior status on July 2, 1981. His service was terminated on January 8, 1987, due to his death of a stroke while on vacation in Christchurch, New Zealand.

Further reading
 William Nelson Cromwell Foundation. Glimpses of Walter Mansfield (New York: Federal Bar Foundation, 1995).
 Ronald D. Rotunda. Remembering Judge Walter R. Mansfield (Brooklyn Law Review 45, 1987: 1).

References

External links
 

1911 births
1987 deaths
United States Marine Corps personnel of World War II
Harvard Law School alumni
Judges of the United States Court of Appeals for the Second Circuit
Judges of the United States District Court for the Southern District of New York
Lawyers from Boston
United States court of appeals judges appointed by Richard Nixon
United States district court judges appointed by Lyndon B. Johnson
20th-century American judges
United States Marines
Assistant United States Attorneys